Burns Clubs exist throughout the world to encourage and cherish the memory of Robert Burns, to foster a love of his writings and generally to encourage an interest in the Scots Language and Literature. An emphasis on encouraging the young to take an interest in Burns is found in most clubs through poetry, singing and other competitions. Once mainly existing as 'male only' clubs in the mould of the Tarbolton 'Batchelor's Club' most now welcome women as fellow members. Ladies Burns Clubs also exist such as the 'Irvine Lasses' that was established in 1975; it has appointed several male 'Honorary Lasses'.

A number of Burns Clubs hold collections of Burns' manuscripts, artefacts or memorabilia such as the Irvine Burns Club which holds the only surviving holograph manuscripts from the Kilmarnock volume of "Poems, Chiefly in the Scottish Dialect" printed and issued by John Wilson, Kilmarnock, on 31 July 1786. Many clubs also have libraries that contain volumes from the many printed works relating to the bard and to Scottish poets, history and culture.

Annual wreath laying ceremonies are held to commemorate personal events such as the birth and death of the poet as well as other significant events in the Bard's life, such as the publication of the Kilmarnock volume.

Many clubs are affiliated to the Burns Federation now known as the Robert Burns World Federation (RBWF) that was formed in 1885 in Kilmarnock and local associations also exist such as the Ayrshire Association of Burns Clubs and the Southern Scottish Counties Burns Association. A feature of most Burns Clubs are annual celebration suppers near or on the anniversary of the poet's birthday, 25 January 1759. In 1959 Glasgow alone had 25 Burns Clubs with a membership of around 4000.

Most Burns Clubs have an open membership; however, some are by invitation, often due to lack of space within their premises such as with the Burns Club Atlanta, the Dumfries Burns Howff Club and the Paisley Burns Club. Most clubs are run by a committee with either Presidents or chairmen as the most senior officials usually serving a one or two-year term. Chains of Office are a distinctive feature of Burns Clubs and these may be inscribed with the names of Past Presidents.

Most Burns Clubs use rented facilities for their meetings, however at least four clubs have their own premises, the Irvine Burns Club, the Howff Club of Dumfries, the Paisley Burns Club and the Burns Club of Atlanta. In 1920 'The Burns House Club' was inaugurated at India Street in Glasgow as a central meeting place for Burns Societies. The Burns Federation of the time met here quarterly.

Titles
Most clubs are named after the settlement in which they are located such as cities or areas within cities, towns, etc. A few clubs append a Burns linked term such as Cronies, Howff, Jolly Beggars, etc. The Alamo Burns Club is named after the inn in which its first Burns Supper was held and two Facebook clubs use Burns's name.

History
The first Burns supper was established in around 1801, attended by Robert Aiken and the address was delivered by Hamilton Paul and within ten years many annual celebrations of the bard's life and works were taking place to the extent that the Reverend William Peebles, a target of Burns' wit, felt compelled to publish a poetical work entitled "Burnomania: the celebrity of Robert Burns considered in a Discourse addressed to all real Christians of every Denomination". By 2004 the Robert Burns World Federation alone had 400 clubs affiliated to it and these reflected a membership of approximately 60,000.

Precedence
The Greenock Burns Club is the 'Mother Club' and was instituted in 1801. It has had celebrations every year since. The Irvine Burns Club has an unbroken history dating back to its formation on 2 June 1826. Of the twelve founding members of the Irvine Burns Club, five were known to Robert Burns, two of whom were close friends of the poet. The Paisley Burns Club (1805) went into abeyance from 1836 to 1874.

Although the Burns Club of London is recorded as No.1 on the Robert Burns World Federation list the Kilmarnock Burns Club was recorded as first on the register as '0'.

Alexandria Burns Club
The Alexandria Burns' Club was formed in 1884, and was federated in 1885 as No. 2 in the Federation list. Its first officials were Messrs Duncan Campbell, president; William Carlile, treasurer; and Alexander Bryan, secretary. Monthly meetings have been held regularly since the formation of the club.

Burns Club of Atlanta

Officially organized in 1896, this Burns Club is a private social club and literary and cultural society commemorating the works of Robert Burns. The club holds monthly meetings and an annual Burns Supper celebration on the anniversary of Burns' birthday every year since 1898. Events are held in the Atlanta Burns Cottage, which is a replica, apart from the thatched roof, of poet Robert Burns' birthplace in Alloway, built in 1909.

Dalry Burns Club
Dalry Burns Club, established in 1825 at Montgomerie's Inn in Courthill Street, now the 'Turf Inn', has one of the longest, continuous record of Burns Suppers - surpassed only by Greenock. Other Burns Clubs were established at an earlier date, but none can match Dalry's unbroken record of annual celebration of the life and works of Robert Burns. The club is 'Number 35' on the role of the Robert Burns World Federation, which was not established until 1884.

United Burns Club of Dunfermline
The 'Haggis Club' first Burns Club in Dunfermline, formed on 25 January 1812 and continuing until 1820. The Dunfermline Burns Club came into existence on 26 January 1820 and then in 1847 the club joined with the Junior Haggis Club to become the United Burns Club of Dunfermline.

Edinburgh Burns Supper Club
The Edinburgh Burns Supper Club was formed in 1848 by Burns' friend and publisher George Thomson and is No. 22 on the Robert Burns World Federation list. Its dinners were attended by Arthur Conan Doyle and John Buchan. It was suspended in 1986 but revived in 2007.

Greenock Burns Club
The first Burns Club, known as 'The Mother Club', was inaugurated as the Greenock Ayrshire Society, in Greenock on 21 July 1801 on the 5th Anniversary of the Bard's death and the club is said to have held their and therefore the first Burns supper on 29 January 1802 in Alloway, but in 1803 it was discovered from the Ayr Parish records that James Currie had made a mistake and the correct date of birth was 25 January 1759. The club had several members who knew Burns, such as Alexander Dalziel, factor to the Earl of Glencairn at Finlaystone, Richard Brown, Burns's friend from Irvine and James Findlay, a gauger (excise) in Greenock who was married to one of the Mauchline Belles, Jean Markland. The club has held an annual celebration every year since its formation and has hosted many illustrious speakers during that time. These include Sir J.M. Barrie, Neil Munro, Lord Glenconner, Earl of Elgin and Kincardine, Sir Patrick Dollan, Compton Mackenzie, Eric Linklater, Rev. Dr. H.C. Whitley, Sir Robert Boothby, W.D. Cocker, Professor Wm. Barclay and more recently, Lord Steel of Aikwood, Baron Wallace of Tankerness and Prof. Gerard Carruthers.

Burns Howff Club of Dumfries
This club was formed in 1889 and joined the Robert Burns World Federation in 1899 as 'Number 112'. Meeting in the Globe Inn at Dumfries and named thus because this was Robert Burns' favourite Dumfries 'Howff' or pub. The club has had four active Club members as Federation President and these have been M. Henry McKerrow (1937-1943), H. George McKerrow (1961), Provost Ernest Robertson (1974) and Albert Finlayson (1978). The club membership is restricted to 120 as its club room within the Globe Inn has restricted space. An extensive library of books relating to Burns and his contemporaries is also located at the Globe Inn and a number of Burns memorabilia and artefacts.

Irvine Burns Club

The Irvine Burns Club, originally formed in the Milne's Inn (now The Crown Inn) is now based in Wellwood House, Eglinton Street, and has an unbroken history dating back to 2 June 1826. The club had twelve founding members of whom five were known to Robert Burns, and two were once his close friends. The original minute of the meeting reads:

"The subscribers agree hereby to form, and do now form ourselves into a Committee for the purpose of establishing a Club, or Society for Commemorating the birth of Robert Burns the Ayrshire Poet - and we agree to meet at an early day to get the preliminaries of the Club properly arranged."

The document is signed by John Mackenzie, M.D.; David Sillar, Bailie; William Gillies, Grain Dealer; John Peebles, Convener of Trades; James Johnston, Town Clerk; Robert Wyllie, Harbour Master; John Orr, Merchant; James Allan, Merchant (grocer); Maxwell Dick, Bookseller; William Shields, Senior, Merchant; John Fletcher, Surgeon; and Patrick Blair, Writer.

Dr John Mackenzie, was the first club president. He had been a doctor in Mauchline, attended Burns' dying father at Lochlea in 1784 and married one of the "Mauchline Belles" before moving to Irvine in the capacity of personal physician to the Earl of Eglinton and his family. David Sillar, the first vice-president, had been a friend of Burns since his teenage years, was a member of the Tarbolton Bachelors Club, became a grocer, and finally an Irvine Council Bailie.

Kilmarnock Number 'O' Burns Club
This club records that it was instituted in 1808 at the Angel Inn and the first President was D. Campbell of Skerrington. The club had several periods of dormancy from 1814 to 1841, 1844, 1849 to 1855, 1871 to 1877 and during the wars years of 1915 to 1919. President Brown of the 'Burns Club of London' helped establish the Robert Burns World Federation in 1885 and acquired the distinction of 'Number 1' for his club, resulting in the Kilmarnock Burns Club having the 'Number 0' appellation conferred upon it at the first minuted meeting at Kilmarnock. Duncan McNaught was a member of the same group that set up what was to become the Robert Burns World Federation and was a president of the club.

Burns Club of London - Number 1
The Burns Club of London was founded in 1868 by Colin Rae Brown, a native of Greenock and a past President of the Greenock Burns Club. He was a wealthy newspaper proprietor and was closely involved in the establishment of the Robert Burns World Federation based in Kilmarnock and as a result the club acquired the distinction of being 'Number 1' on the Federations list and the Kilmarnock Burns Club responded by acquiring the appellation of 'Number 0'. The Club meets regularly at The Caledonian Club, Belgravia, London. On 25 January, Members and guests meet to lay a wreath at the Burns monument on Embankment, London. Special celebrations are being planned for the club's 150th anniversary in 2018, including publication of the club's history by Past President, Dr Clark McGinn.

Paisley Burns Club

This club was founded in 1805 and claims to be the world's oldest formally constituted Burns Club, seemingly with the original name 'Paisley Burns' Anniversary Society'. It meets monthly during the winter in the cottage once owned by Robert Tannahill, Paisley's weaver poet and songwriter, founder and first secretary. The club owns its premises, donated to the Paisley Burns Club in 1933. Club membership is still all-male and is limited to 40. The club was in abeyance from 1836 to 1874.

Dundee Burns Club
The Dundee Burns Club was founded in 1860, From 1877, the club was the driving force behind the erection of John Steell's statue to Robert Burns in Dundee's Albert Square. A silk banner commissioned for the unveiling of the statue in 1880 is now held by the McManus Gallery and was restored in 2012. The club has the distinction of having a specially-written pipe reel named after it, "The Dundee Burns Club", written by the celebrated Scots fiddler James Scott Skinner.

Partick Burns Club
The Partick Burns Club was instituted in 1885  and has met to honour Robert Burns every January since then, with the exception of some years during the First and Second World Wars.
The club was founded by the merchants, trades people and members of the Partick Burgh council and the club Presidents up to 1912 (when Partick was incorporated into greater Glasgow) were almost uniquely the Provosts of the Burgh. Its annual supper normally has an attendance of approx. 130, with ages ranging from nineteen to ninety.

Winnipeg Robert Burns Club
The Winnipeg Robert Burns Club was founded in 1907 and joined the Burns Federation in 1911 as  #197 on the rolls and claims to be the "oldest continuously existing federated Burns Club outside the United Kingdom."
The club was founded by a group of workers at the CPR Weston Shops in the west end of the city who had gotten together to hold a Burns Supper in January 1907, and other Scottish migrants, in the autumn of 1907. It erected a statue to Robert Burns, a replica of the George Lawson statue in Ayr, on the grounds of the Manitoba Legislature in 1936.  It annually holds its Burns Supper on 25 January.

Activities

Apart from Burns suppers and involvement with school and club based Burns Competitions for young people clubs have inter-club nights and other social activities such as the Professor Ross Roy Quiz Night held by the Ayrshire Association of Burns Clubs.

Local clubs and the Robert Burns World Federation also help to maintain various Robert Burns linked sites such as the 'Trysting Tree' of Robert Burns's poem The Soldier's Return at Millmannoch and the Highland Mary and Robert Burns Memorial at Failford, both in Ayrshire.

Clubs also raise money for charitable purposes, hold lectures, carry out original research, have ladies or Jean Armour Nights, St Andrew's Nights, Hallowe'en Nights, Annual Excursions and take part in specific local events such as the 'Marymass Events' held at Irvine.

Every year the Southern Scottish Counties Burns Association organises a service at the Brow Well to commemorate the death of Robert Burns who died four days after his visit to the Brow Well on 21 July 1796.

The 'Burns Chronicle' first published by the Robert Burns World Federation in 1891 acts as a record of clubs and their activities with Burns related articles contributed by members with special editions being occasionally issued for events such as the 2009 'Homecoming'.

Links with the Freemasons

Robert Burns was initiated in Lodge St. David, Tarbolton in 1781, at the age of 23. Burns was elected "Depute Master" of the Lodge St. James at the age of 25. At a meeting of Lodge St. Andrew in Edinburgh in 1787 Burns was toasted by the Worshipful Grand Master. In February 1787, Burns was made the Poet Laureate of Lodge Canongate Kilwinning No. 2, Edinburgh. Burns was exalted a companion in the Holy Royal Arch Degree in 1787 at St. Ebbe's Lodge, Eyemouth. The companions even agreed to admit Burns without paying the necessary fees. When Burns moved to Dumfries, he joined Lodge St. Andrew in 1788. In 1792, he was elected Senior Warden. A strong link with Freemasonary is a feature of a number of Burns Clubs.

See also

 Brow, Dumfries and Galloway
 Drukken Steps
 Ellisland Farm, Dumfries
 Friar's Carse
 Robert Burns and the Eglinton Estate
 Robert Burns' diamond point engravings
 Robert Burns World Federation

References
Notes

Sources
 Chalmers, Archibald (2009). Roll of Presidents of Kilmarnock No. 0 Burns Club. Club Archives.
 Mackay, James A. (1985). "The Burns Federation 1885 - 1985." Kilmarnock : The Burns Federation. 
 Mackay, James (2004). Burns. A Biography of Robert Burns. Darvel : Alloway Publishing. .
 Mackenna, James (1959). "The Homes and Haunts of Robert Burns". London : Collins. 
 Reid, Donald (2001). In the Valley of the Garnock (Beith, Dalry & Kilbirnie). Beith : DoE. .
 Westwood, Peter J. Edit. (2010). Homecoming Burns Chronicle 2009. Robert Burns World Federation.

External links
 Alamo Burns Club
 Alexandria Burns Club
 Alexandria Burns Club
 Dalry Burns Club
 United Dunfermline Burns Club
 Greenock Burns Club
 Irvine Burns Club
 Burns Club of London
 Mauchline Burns Club
 Partick Burns Club
 Researching the Life and Times of Robert Burns - Researcher's site.

Robert Burns
Literary fan clubs
Scottish culture
Events in Scotland
Scottish traditions
Canadian traditions
Scottish cuisine
Eating parties
Clubs and societies in the United States
Culture of Atlanta
Organizations based in Atlanta
Gentlemen's clubs in the United States